Wildlife Wars: My Fight to Save Africa's Natural Treasures is a book written by Richard Leakey and Virginia Morell. It was published in 2001 by St. Martin's Press.

Overview

It tells of how Leakey had been director of National Museum when appointed in 1989, President Daniel arap Moi appointed him to run the Kenya Wildlife Service. This was an entirely new experience to Leakey, because he had been accustomed to studying hominids, not managing wildlife. Elephant poaching had been a major problem in the Kenyan National Parks, and the book tells of his efforts to stop it, sometimes with a danger to his life.

Reception
The book was reviewed in the journal Endangered Species, the ALA magazine Booklist, Publishers Weekly, Books in Canada, African Business, the  Royal Geographical Society's Geographical magazine.

Editions
Wildlife Wars:  My Fight to Save Africa's Natural Treasures

References

2001 in the environment
Environmental non-fiction books